Burning Down the House is a 2001 film directed by Philippe Mora.  It was written by Michael Cole Dinelli, who adapted it from his play High Tension in the Tropics.  It was shot in 1998 and released direct-to-video in the United States.

Plot 
Unable to find funding for his next film, a Hollywood director burns down his house for the insurance money.

Cast 
 John Savage as Jake Seiling
 James Wilder as Arnie Green
 Joanne Baron as Brenda Goodman
 Ceasar Cavaricci as Ray
 William Atherton as Arthur Kranston
 Mick Fleetwood as Bartender
 C. Thomas Howell as Concierge
 René Auberjonois as Pierre
 David Keith as Carolina
 Arye Gross as Bob Washington
 Orson Bean as Sy

Reception 
Robert Koehler of Variety wrote that Mora and the cast "appear clueless from first frame to last".

References

External links 
 

2001 films
2001 comedy films
American comedy films
Films directed by Philippe Mora
2000s English-language films
2000s American films